British Standard Whitworth (BSW) is an imperial-unit-based screw thread standard, devised and specified by Joseph Whitworth in 1841 and later adopted as a British Standard. It was the world's first national screw thread standard, and is the basis for many other standards, such as BSF, BSP, BSCon, and BSCopper.

History

The Whitworth thread was the world's first national screw thread standard,<ref>Gilbert, K. R., & Galloway, D. F., 1978, "Machine Tools". In C. Singer, et al., (Eds.), 'A history of technology. Oxford, Clarendon Press & Lee, S. (Ed.), 1900, Dictionary of national biography, Vol LXI. Smith Elder, London</ref> devised and specified by Joseph Whitworth in 1841. Until then, the only standardization was what little had been done by individual people and companies, with some companies' in-house standards spreading a bit within their industries. Whitworth's new standard specified a 55° thread angle and a thread depth of 0.640327p and a radius of 0.137329p, where p is the pitch. The thread pitch increases with diameter in steps specified on a chart.

The Whitworth thread system was later to be adopted as a British Standard to become British Standard Whitworth (BSW). An example of the use of the Whitworth thread are the Royal Navy's Crimean War gunboats. These are the first instance of mass-production  techniques being applied to marine engineering, as the following quotation from the obituary from The Times of 24 January 1887 for Sir Joseph Whitworth (1803–1887) shows:

An original example of the gunboat type engine was raised from the wreck of the SS Xantho by the Western Australian Museum. On disassembly, all its threads were shown to be of the Whitworth type.

With the adoption of BSW by British railway companies, many of which had previously used their own standards both for threads and for bolt head and nut profiles, and the growing need generally for standardisation in  manufacturing specifications, it came to dominate British manufacturing.

In the US, BSW was replaced when steel bolts replaced iron, but was still being used for some aluminium parts as late as the 1960s and 1970s when metric-based standards International Inch replaced the U.S. inch and U.K. inch in 1951-1964.

American Unified Coarse (UNC) was originally based on almost the same Imperial fractions.  The Unified thread angle is 60° and has flattened crests (Whitworth crests are rounded). From  in up to  in, thread pitch is the same in both systems except that the thread pitch for the  in bolt is 12 threads per inch (tpi) in BSW versus 13 tpi in the UNC.

Thread form

The form of a Whitworth thread is based on a fundamental triangle with an angle of 55° at each peak and valley. The sides are at a flank angle of Θ = 27.5° perpendicular to the axis. Thus, if the thread pitch is p, the height of the fundamental triangle is H = p/(2tanΘ) = 0.96049106p. The peaks are further reduced by rounding them with a 2×(90° − Θ) = 180° − 55° = 125° circular arc. This arc has a height of e = Hsin Θ/6 = 0.073917569p (leaving a straight flank depth of h − 2e = 0.49249224p) and a radius of r = e/(1 − sin Θ) = 0.13732908p.

List of thread sizes
Below is the historical thread size table, not to be confused with G threads, which are actually in use as British Standard Pipe . For example a G½ (half inch) is 20.955mm in diameter.

Spanner (Wrench) size
To simplify matters, the term hexagon is used in this section to denote either bolt head or nut.

Whitworth and BSF spanner markings refer to the bolt diameter, rather than the distance across the flats of the hexagon (A/F) as in other standards. Confusion can arise because each Whitworth hexagon was originally one size larger than that of the corresponding BSF fastener. This leads to instances where for example, a spanner marked  BSF is the same size as one marked  W. In both cases the spanner jaw width of 0.710 in, the width across the hexagon flat, is the same.

Certain branches of industry used Whitworth fasteners with a smaller hexagon (identical to BSF of the same bolt diameter) under the designation "AutoWhit" or Auto-Whit  and this series was formalised by the British Engineering Standards Association in 1929 as standard No. 193, with the 'original' series being No. 190 and the BSF series No. 191.

During World War II the smaller size hexagon was adopted more widely to save metal and this usage persisted thereafter. Thus it is today common to encounter a Whitworth hexagon which does not fit the nominally correct spanner and following the previous example, a more modern spanner may be marked  BS to indicate that they have a jaw size of 0.710 in and designed to take either the (later)  BSW or  BSF hexagon.Whitworth / BSF to AF (SAE) and metric sizes

Whitworth fasteners with the larger hexagons to BS 190 are now often colloquially referred to as 'pre-war' size, even though that is not strictly correct.

List of hex head sizes

Comparison with other standards
The British Standard Fine (BSF) standard has the same thread angle as the BSW, but has a finer thread pitch and smaller thread depth. This is more like the modern "mechanical" screw and was used for fine machinery and for steel bolts.

The British Standard Cycle (BSC) standard which replaced the Cycle Engineers' Institute (CEI) standard was used on British bicycles and motorcycles. It uses a thread angle of 60° compared to the Whitworth 55° and very fine thread pitches.

The British Association screw thread (BA) standard is sometimes classed with the Whitworth standard fasteners because it is often found in the same machinery as the Whitworth standard. However it is actually a metric based standard that uses a 47.5° thread angle and has its own set of head sizes. BA threads have diameters of 6 mm (0BA) and smaller, and were and still are particularly used in precision machinery.

The Whitworth 55° angle remains commonly used today worldwide in form of the 15 British standard pipe threads defined in ISO 7, which are commonly used in water supply, cooling, pneumatics, and hydraulic systems. These threads are designated by a number between 1/16 and 6 that originates from the nominal internal diameter (i/d) in inches of a steel pipe for which these threads were designed. These pipe thread designations do not refer to any thread diameter.

Other threads that used the Whitworth 55° angle include Brass Threads, British Standard Conduit (BSCon), Model Engineers' (ME), and British Standard Copper (BSCopper).

Current usage

The widely used (except in the US) British Standard Pipe thread, as defined by the ISO 228 standard (formerly BS-2779), uses Whitworth standard thread form.  Even in the United States, personal computer liquid cooling components use the G thread from this series.

The Leica Thread-Mount used on rangefinder cameras and on many enlarging lenses is  in by 26 turns-per-inch Whitworth, an artifact of this having been developed by a German company specializing in microscopes and thus equipped with tooling capable of handling threads in inches and in Whitworth.

The  in Whitworth threads have been the standard Meccano thread for many years and it is still the thread in use by the French Meccano Company.

Stage lighting suspension bolts are most commonly  in and  in BSW. Companies that initially converted to metric threads have converted back, after complaints that the finer metric threads increased the time and difficulty of setup, which often takes place at the top of a ladder or scaffold.

Fixings for garden gates traditionally used Whitworth carriage bolts, and these are still the standard supplied in UK and Australia.

Historical misuse
British Morris and MG engines from 1923 to 1955 were built using metric threads but with bolt heads and nuts dimensioned for Whitworth spanners and sockets. In 1919, Morris Motors took over the French Hotchkiss engine works which had moved to Coventry during the First World War. The Hotchkiss machine tools were of metric thread but metric spanners were not readily available in Britain at the time, so fasteners were made with metric thread but Whitworth heads.

In popular culture
In the 2011 movie Cars 2 by Disney / Pixar, the vital clue to the discovery of the villain, Sir Miles Axlerod, is that he uses Whitworth bolts.  Although Axlerod does not precisely resemble any real car (whereas numerous other characters are closely modelled on real cars), he seems most closely to match the original Range Rover Classic.  In reality, early model Range Rovers used parts with imperial dimensions, although the photograph of the villain's engine is virtually identical to the later 3.5 litre single plenum Rover V8 (A design purchased from GM's Buick).

See also
Other thread standards:
 British Association screw threads (BA)
 British standard brass thread
 British Standard Cycle
 British standard fine thread (BSF)
 British Standard Pipe (BSP)
 ISO metric screw thread
 Unified Thread Standard (UTS, including UNC, UNF, UNS and UNEF)

References

Bibliography
 Oberg, E., Jones, F.D., Hussain, M., McCauley, C.J., Ryffel, H.H. and Heald, R.M. (2008) Machinery's handbook : a reference book for the mechanical engineer, designer, manufacturing engineer, draftsman, toolmaker, and machinist'', 28th Ed., New York : Industrial Press, p. 1858–1860

External links
 Whitworth Threads

Thread standards
Screws
British Standards